Liiva (Estonian for "Sand") is a subdistrict in the district of Nõmme, Tallinn, the capital of Estonia.

It has a railway station on the Tallinn - Viljandi railway line operated by Elron (rail transit).

Liiva cemetery is situated in Liiva.

Gallery

References 

Subdistricts of Tallinn